The 2018–19 Twenty20 Blaze was the fifth season of the women's Twenty20 cricket competition played in the West Indies. It ran from March to April 2019, with 6 teams taking part and all matches taking place at Providence Stadium in Guyana. Barbados won the tournament, winning all five of their matches to claim their second T20 title.

The tournament followed the 2018–19 Women's Super50 Cup.

Competition format 
Teams played in a round-robin in a group of six, therefore playing 5 matches overall. Matches were played using a Twenty20 format. The top team in the group were crowned the Champions.

The group worked on a points system with positions being based on the total points. Points were awarded as follows:

Win: 3 points 
Loss: 0 points.
Abandoned/No Result: 2 points.

Points table

Source: Windies Cricket

Fixtures

Statistics

Most runs

Source: CricketArchive

Most wickets

Source: CricketArchive

References

External links
 Series home at Windies Cricket

Twenty20 Blaze
2019 in West Indian cricket
Domestic cricket competitions in 2018–19